Beerschoten is a hamlet in the municipality Utrechtse Heuvelrug, in the Dutch province Utrecht.

Beerschoten lies on the edge of a forest between the towns of Zeist (to the northwest) and Driebergen-Rijsenburg (to the southeast). Just north of the hamlet is the railway station Driebergen-Zeist. The hamlet grew around the estate "Beerschoten-Willinkshof". It was first mentioned in 1874 Beerschoten and was named after a manor house with was demolished in 1850. It is not a statistical entity, and the postal authorities have placed it under Zeist.

References 

Populated places in Utrecht (province)
Utrechtse Heuvelrug